Deobandis are the followers of the Deobandi movement, which originated in Deoband, India in the mid-19th century. The movement emphasizes a strict adherence to Islamic law and traditional Islamic scholarship, particularly in the areas of hadith and fiqh.

A

 Abd al-Hayy al-Lucknawi
 Abdul Aziz Malazada
 Abdul Haq Akorwi
 Abdul Haq Azmi
 Ahmad Hasan Amrohi
 Akram Toofani
 Ali Sher Hyderi
 Anwar Shah Kashmiri
 Anwar-ul-Haq Haqqani
 Ahmad Ali Saharanpuri
 Anzar Shah Kashmiri
 Abdul Hai Arifi
 Asghar Hussain Deobandi
 Ashiq Ilahi Bulandshahri
 Azhar Shah Qaiser
 Abdul Wahid Bengali
 Athar Ali Bengali
 Ashraf Ali Bishwanathi
 Abdul Halim Bukhari
 Abdul Ghani Azhari
 Aziz-ul-Rahman Usmani
 Abdul Aziz
 Abdur Rahman Chatgami
 Abdus Salam Chatgami
 Abdul Haleem Chishti
 Abdul Jalil Choudhury
 Abdul Majid Daryabadi
 Abdul Matin Chowdhury
 Abdul Rashid Ghazi
 Abdul Ghafoor Haideri
 Abdul Malek Halim
 Abdul Salam Hanafi
 Azizul Haq
 Abrarul Haq Haqqi
 Azizul Haque
 Aziz Ur Rahman Hazarvi
 A F M Khalid Hossain
 Asrarul Haq Qasmi
 Abdolhamid Ismaeelzahi
 Abdul Bari Nadvi
 Abdul Hameed Swati
 Abdul Hamid Madarshahi
 Abdul Jabbar Jahanabadi
 Abdul Khaliq Sambhali
 Abdul Majeed Ludhianvi
 Abdul Momin Imambari
 Abdul Qadir Raipuri
 Abdul Rauf Azhar
 Abdul Wahhab Pirji
 Abdur Rahman ibn Yusuf Mangera
 Abdur Razzaq Iskander
 Abu Taher Misbah
 Abu Yusuf Riyadh ul Haq
 Abul Hasan Ali Hasani Nadwi
 Abul Hasan Jashori
 Abul Muhasin Muhammad Sajjad
 Ahmad Laat
 Ahmad Narouei
 Ahmed Ali Lahori
 Allah Wasaya
 Amjad M. Mohammed
 Arshad Madani
 Asad Madani
 Ashraf Ali Thanwi
 Azam Tariq

C
 Cassim Sema
 Chaudhry Abid Raza

D
 Deen Muhammad Khan

E
 Ebrahim Desai
 Ehtisham ul Haq Thanvi

F
 Faizul Waheed
 Farid Uddin Masood
 Fateh Muhammad Panipati
 Fazal-ur-Rehman
 Fazli Ghafoor
 Fazlul Haque Amini
 Fazlur Rahman Usmani
 Fida-Ur-Rehman Darkhawasti
 Fuzail Ahmad Nasiri

G
 Ghulam Mohammad Sadiq
 Ghulam Muhammad Din Puri
 Ghulam Nabi Kashmiri
 Ghulam Ullah Khan

H
 Habib al-Rahman al-'Azmi
 Habib-ur-Rehman Ludhianvi
 Habibullah Qurayshi
 Habibur Rahman Khairabadi
 Hafiz Muhammad Ahmad
 Hafiz Patel
 Hafizur Rahman Wasif Dehlavi
 Haji Yunus
 Hakeem Muhammad Akhtar
 Hamid Ul Haq Haqqani
 Hamid al-Ansari Ghazi
 Haq Nawaz Jhangvi
 Harun Babunagari
 Hasan Jan
 Hifzur Rahman Seoharwi
 Hussain Ahmed Madani
 Hussain Umarji

I
 Ibrahim Chatuli
 Ibrahim Mogra
 Ibrahim Ujani
 Ijteba Nadwi
 Ilyas Kandhlawi
 Imamuddin Punjabi
 Inamul Hasan Kandhlawi
 Isar-ul-Haq Qasmi
 Ishaq Sambhali
 Ismail Ahmed Cachalia
 Izaz Ali Amrohi
 Izharul Islam Chowdhury

J
 Jalaluddin Haqqani
 Jamaat Ansarullah
 John Mohammed Butt
 Juma Khan
 Junaid Babunagari

K
 Kaleem Siddiqui
 Khair Muhammad Jalandhari
 Khalid Hafiz
 Khalid Saifullah Rahmani
 Khalil Ahmad Saharanpuri
 Khawaja Khan Muhammad
 Kifayatullah Dehlawi

M

 Mahfoozur Rahman Nami
 Mahfuzul Haque
 Mahmood Ahmed Ghazi
 Mahmood Ashraf Usmani
 Mahmood Madani
 Mahmud Deobandi
 Mahmud Hasan Deobandi
 Mahmudul Hasan
 Majid Ali Jaunpuri
 Malik Ishaq
 Mamunul Haque
 Manazir Ahsan Gilani
 Manzoor Mengal
 Manzoor Nomani
 Maqsudullah
 Marghubur Rahman
 Masihullah Khan
 Masood Azhar
 Masroor Nawaz Jhangvi
 Matinul Haq Usama Qasmi
 Mazhar Nanautawi
 Minnatullah Rahmani
 Mizanur Rahman Sayed
 Moavia Azam Tariq
 Mohammad Mujahid Khan Al Hussaini
 Mohammad Najeeb Qasmi
 Mufti Abdul Razzaq
 Mufti Mehmood
 Mufti Muhammad Naeem
 Muhammad Abdul Wahhab
 Muhammad Abdullah Ghazi
 Muhammad Adil Khan
 Muhammad Ahmed Ludhianvi
 Muhammad Ali Jalandhari
 Muhammad Ali Mungeri
 Muhammad Faizullah
 Muhammad Hanif Jalandhari
 Muhammad Hassan
 Muhammad Idris Kandhlawi
 Muhammad Ilyas Ghuman
 Muhammad Mian Mansoor Ansari
 Muhammad Miyan Deobandi
 Muhammad Musa Ruhani Bazi
 Muhammad Mustafa Azmi
 Muhammad Qasim Nanautavi
 Muhammad Rafi Usmani
 Muhammad Saad Kandhlawi
 Muhammad Saeed Khan
 Muhammad Sahool Bhagalpuri
 Muhammad Salim Qasmi
 Muhammad Sarfaraz Khan Safdar
 Muhammad Shafi Deobandi
 Muhammad Sufyan Qasmi
 Muhammad Taqi Amini
 Muhammad Tayyib Qasmi
 Muhammad Yunus Jaunpuri
 Muhammadullah Hafezzi
 Muhibbullah Babunagari
 Muhiuddin Khan
 Munir Shakir
 Murtaza Hasan Chandpuri
 Mushahid Ahmad Bayampuri
 Muzammil Hussain Kapadia

N
 Najib Ali Choudhury
 Nasiruddin Khakwani
 Nazar-ur-Rehman
 Nazir Ahmad Qasmi
 Nizamuddin Asir Adrawi
 Nizamuddin Shamzai
 Noman Naeem
 Noor Alam Khalil Amini
 Noor Muhammad
 Nur Hossain Kasemi
 Nur Uddin Gohorpuri
 Nurul Islam Jihadi
 Nurul Islam Olipuri

O
 Obaidul Haque
 Obaidullah Hamzah
 Oliur Rahman

Q
 Qari Ismail
 Qazi Athar Mubarakpuri
 Qazi Hamidullah Khan
 Qazi Mu'tasim Billah

R
 Rabey Hasani Nadwi
 Rafiq Ahmad Pampori
 Rafiuddin Deobandi
 Rahmatullah Mir Qasmi
 Rahmatullah Safi
 Rashid Ahmad Gangohi
 Rashid Ahmed Ludhianvi
 Riaz Basra
 Ruhul Amin

S

 Saeed Ahmad Akbarabadi
 Saeed Ahmad Palanpuri
 Saeed-ur-Rahman Azmi Nadvi
 Sajidur Rahman
 Sajjad Afghani
 Sajjad Nomani
 Saleemullah Khan
 Salman Mazahiri
 Salman Nadwi
 Sami-ul-Haq
 Sardar Ali Haqqani
 Sayyid Muhammad Abid
 Sayyid Mumtaz Ali
 Shabbir Ahmad Usmani
 Shah Abd al-Wahhab
 Shah Ahmad Hasan
 Shah Ahmad Shafi
 Shah Saeed Ahmed Raipuri
 Shahabuddin Popalzai
 Shahidul Islam
 Shaikh Idrees
 Shams-ud-din Harifal
 Shamsuddin Qasemi
 Shamsul Haq Afghani
 Shamsul Haque Faridpuri
 Sheikh Rahimullah Haqqani
 Shibli Nomani
 Shihabuddin Nadvi
 Shukrullah Mubarakpuri
 Sufi Azizur Rahman
 Sulaiman Nadvi
 Sultan Ahmad Nanupuri
 Sultan Zauq Nadvi
 Syed Abuzar Bukhari
 Syed Adnan Kakakhail
 Syed Ahmad Hashmi
 Syed Ata Ullah Shah Bukhari
 Syed Ata-ul-Mohsin Bukhari
 Syed Ata-ul-Muhaimin Bukhari
 Syed Ehtisham Ahmed Nadvi
 Syed Faizul Karim
 Syed Fakhruddin Ahmad
 Syed Fazlul Karim
 Syed Mehboob Rizwi
 Syed Muhammad Ishaq
 Syed Mukhtaruddin Shah
 Syed Noor ul Hassan Bukhari
 Syed Rezaul Karim
 Syed Sher Ali Shah

T
 Taha Karaan
 Tahir Mehmood Ashrafi
 Tanveer-ul-Haq Thanvi
 Taqi Usmani
 Tariq Masood

U
 Ubaidul Haq
 Ubaidullah Anwar
 Ubaidullah Sindhi
 Usman Mansoorpuri
 Usmani family of Deoband
 Uzair Gul Peshawari

W
 Wali Hasan Tonki
 Wali Rahmani
 Wazeh Rashid Hasani Nadwi

Y
 Yaqub Nanautawi
 Yasir Nadeem al Wajidi
 Yusuf Kandhlawi
 Yusuf Karaan
 Yusuf Ludhianvi

Z
 Zafar Ahmad Usmani
 Zafeeruddin Miftahi
 Zakariyya Kandhlawi
 Zar Wali Khan
 Zayn al-Abidin Sajjad Meerthi
 Zia Uddin
 Zulfiqar Ahmad Naqshbandi

See also 
 List of Deobandi organisations
 List of Deobandi madrasas
 List of Ash'aris and Maturidis

Deobandi-related lists
Hanafis
Maturidis